Thượng Đình Station is a metro station in Hanoi, located in Thanh Xuân, Hanoi.

Station layout

Line 2A

References

External links
Thượng Đình Station

Hanoi Metro stations